"Zero Gravity" is a song performed by Australian singer Kate Miller-Heidke. It was released as a single on 25 January 2019, and was Australia's entry in the Eurovision Song Contest 2019 after it won the jury and public vote on Eurovision - Australia Decides on 9 February 2019.

In an interview with broadcaster SBS, Miller-Heidke said she has always known of Eurovision, but became more invested since Australia became involved. She said "I think what I love about Eurovision is the permission to go a bit bonkers and I love how it embraces all different genres and different levels of experimental music and performance. I love how theatrical it is."

The song was performed during the first Eurovision semi-final on 14 May 2019, and qualified for the final. It finished in ninth place with 284 points. The performance featured the singer and two dancers atop large bendy poles, using their body weight to sway themselves through the air above the stage.

At the APRA Music Awards of 2020, the song was shortlisted for Song of the Year.

Background
"Zero Gravity" has been called a pop-opera song. Miller-Heidke wrote the song following her experience with post-natal depression after the birth of her son, Ernie, and how she felt "weightless" as she recovered. "Miller-Heidke said "For me, after the birth of my son, Ernie, I went through a long period of feeling like I'd lost my identity and feeling very sort of foggy and down in a lot of ways, and it took a couple of years after he was born for me to feel like I was regaining my strength and clarity, and motivation, and a sense of who I was as well. And that was just an amazing feeling and so that's what this song tried to capture."

Critical reception
auspOp reviewed the track, calling it "cute, danceable, quirky, edgy and just a little bit bonkers. It blends pop, dance and even opera and allows Kate to showcase her extraordinary vocal ability. So pretty perfect, it seems."

Track listing
All tracks composed by Kate Miller-Heidke, Keir Nuttall and Julian Hamilton, with lyrics by Miller-Heidke and Nuttall.

"Zero Gravity" – 2:57
"Zero Gravity" (Acoustic) – 3:38
"Zero Gravity" (Radio Edit) – 2:39
"Zero Gravity" (7th Heaven Remix) – 3:55
"Zero Gravity" (Where It's ATT Remix) – 3:13
"Zero Gravity" (Donatachi Remix) – 2:59

Charts

Release history

References

2019 singles
2019 songs
Eurovision songs of 2019
Eurovision songs of Australia
Kate Miller-Heidke songs
Songs written by Kate Miller-Heidke
Songs written by Keir Nuttall
Songs written by Julian Hamilton